Bunchosia hartwegiana is a species of plant in the Malpighiaceae family. It is found in Colombia and Panama.

References

hartwegiana
Least concern plants
Taxonomy articles created by Polbot